Rudik Hyusnunts is the deputy speaker of the Nagorno-Karabakh legislature.
He is also deputy chief of the Nagorno-Karabakh Security Council.

References

1963 births
Living people
Hyusnunts, Rudik